Ahmedabad Kali Bari (Devnagari: अहमदाबाद काली बारी) is a Hindu temple dedicated to Goddess Kali and the center for Bengali Culture in Ahmedabad, India. Established in 2014, it is situated on Kali Bari Road, West Ahmedabad.

History 
The temple was built in 2014 by the Bengal Cultural Association of Ahmedabad, one of the oldest Bengali community organizations in Gujarat. 

The temple is also known for the Durga Puja festival that is held every year on a field next to it. More than 80 years ago, the group that is in charge of this Kali Bari held the first Durga Puja in Ahmedabad. In 2022, it celebrated the 85th Durga Puja.

Architecture 
The main building of the temple is an example of Bengal architecture depicting traditional Bengali kutir (hut) style.

Gallery

References 

Hindu temples in Ahmedabad
Kali temples
Bengali culture
2014 establishments in Gujarat